Chittayam Gopakumar (born 30 May 1965) is an Indian politician who belongs to the Communist Party of India. He got elected to the Kerala Legislative Assembly for the first time in 2011 as a candidate from Adoor constituency in Pathanamthitta District. He won again from the same constituency with a huge margin in 2016. He is current Deputy Speaker of Kerala Legislative Assembly.

He contested in the 2019 Indian general election in Kerala as a candidate of the LDF from Mavelikara constituency and lost to the Indian National Congress candidate Kodikkunnil Suresh.

Personal life
He was born on 30 May 1965, as son of T. Gopalakrishnan and T. K. Devayani, at Chittayam in Kollam District. He completed Pre-degree from St. Gregorios College, Kottarakkara but was not able to study further due to poor financial situation of his family. He is married to C. Sherlley Bai. They have two daughters, Anooja and Amrita.

Political career

Chittayam Gopakumar entered politics through All India Students Federation (AISF), during his school days. He became the state committee member of AISF. 
He later joined All India Trade Union Congress (AITUC) and started organising trade union movements. He became AITUC state working committee member. He was the state secretary of Kerala Kashuvandi Thozhilali Kendra Council (Kerala Cashew Workers central union), State President of Asha Workers Union and Kollam district president of Kerala State Karshaka Thozhilali Federation (BKMU). 
At 18 years age, he joined Communist Party of India (CPI) as a branch committee member. He is now the state council member of CPI.

In 2011, CPI put him as a candidate from Adoor constituency, for the Kerala Legislative assembly election.  He won the seat with a margin of 607 votes, by defeating the Congress candidate Pandalam Sudhakaran.

During that period, he became the Chairman of the committee on Welfare of Backward class communities.

In 2016, he was again re-elected from the same constituency with a bigger margin of 25,460 votes, defeating Congress candidate K.K. Shaju.

In the 2019 Parliament election, he lost to Congress candidate and sitting MP Kodikkunnil Suresh from Mavelikara Loksabha constituency with a bigger margin of 61,138 votes.[7]. In the 2021 Kerala legislative assembly elections he was re-elected again from the Adoor constituency by defeating the congress candidate M G Kannan with a margin of 2919 votes.

References

External links
www.thehindu.com

1965 births
Communist Party of India politicians from Kerala
Living people
People from Kollam district
Kerala MLAs 2016–2021
Deputy Speakers of the Kerala Legislative Assembly